Maynard Owen Williams (September 12, 1888 – June 1963) became the first National Geographic foreign correspondent in 1919. Over the course of his career, he explored Asia and witnessed the Russian Revolution.

In 1923, he witnessed the public opening of King Tut's Tomb in the Kingdom of Egypt, then a British protectorate.

In 1931, he participated in the Croisière Jaune (Yellow Expedition) of Georges-Marie Haardt for the Citroën company and travelled to Afghanistan and British India.

In his own words a "camera-coolie and a roughneck,"  Williams pioneered the field of travel photography. The Maynard Owen Williams Prize for creative nonfiction at Kalamazoo College is named in his memory.

References

Further reading 
 A National Geographic article on Armenia, by Maynard Owen Williams
 At the tomb of Tutankhamen, by Maynard Owen Williams
 Maynard Owen Williams with video of the Asian Expedition, by eview1.com

American male journalists
1888 births
1963 deaths
National Geographic photographers
American photographers